Rathouisia is a genus of carnivorous air-breathing land slugs, terrestrial pulmonate gastropod mollusks in the family Rathouisiidae.

Rathouisia is the type genus of the family Rathouisiidae.

The generic name Rathouisia is in honour of French Jesuit Père Charles Rathouis (1834–1890), who made scientific drawings for Pierre Marie Heude.

Species 
Species within the genus Rathouisia include:
 Rathouisia leonina Heude, 1882 – synonym: Vaginulus sinensis Heude, 1882 – type species of the genus Rathouisia
 Rathouisia pantherina Heude, 1882
 Rathouisia tigrina Heude, 1882

Distribution 
The predatory carnivorous slugs in the genus Rathouisia are found in China and Hong Kong.

References

Rathouisiidae
Gastropod genera
Gastropods of Asia
Taxa named by Pierre Marie Heude